John Joseph Nash (died February 1989) was a member of Seanad Éireann from 1961 to 1973 on the Cultural and Educational Panel. He represented the Fianna Fáil party. He died in an accident while on holiday in February 1989.

References

Year of birth missing
1989 deaths
Fianna Fáil senators
Members of the 10th Seanad
Members of the 11th Seanad
Members of the 12th Seanad